Patrick Schöffski is a German medical doctor specializing in internal medicine, hematology and medical oncology.

Early life and education
Schöffski originates from Hannover, Germany, where he also received a master's degree in public health at Hannover Medical School.

Career
Schöffski is the head of the Department of General Medical Oncology at the University Hospitals Leuven and also leads the Laboratory of Experimental Oncology at KU Leuven, Belgium. He was Secretary-General of the Executive Committee and Board of the European Organisation for Research and Treatment of Cancer (EORTC), part of the board of directors of the European Cancer Organisation (ECCO) and the Connective Tissue Oncology Society (CTOS) and is a current member of the American Society of Clinical Oncology (ASCO), and the American Association for Cancer Research (AACR). He is the current Chair of ASCO's Membership Committee. In 2013 he was appointed member of the Belgian Royal Academy of Medicine.

Schöffski was faculty and the Scientific Chair of the Methods in Clinical Cancer Research Workshop series in Flims, Switzerland, organized by AACR, ECCO, ESMO and EORTC.  

He was Work Package Leader in the Connective Tissue Cancers Network (CONTICANET), a Network of Excellence funded by the European Commission’s Sixth Framework Programme, and is a member of the EURACAN network for rare malignancies and involved in the development and update of important European clinical practice guidelines for rare cancers including sarcoma. 

In 2019 Schöffski founded FORTRESS, the Forum for Translational Research in Sarcomas, an annual meeting for scientists involved in laboratory research in the field of soft tissue and bone sarcoma and gastrointestinal stromal tumors. The meeting is organized in collaboration with researchers from KU Leuven and Westdeutsches Tumorzentrum in Essen (Germany), alternates between Leuven and Essen, and is supported by patient advocacy groups.

Research
Schöffski’s main clinical interest is the treatment of solid tumors and lymphomas. He is involved in prospective clinical trials (Phase I-III) in various tumor types, with a focus on orphan malignancies. He leads an active phase I trial team in Leuven and has a strong interest in multitumor phase II-screening studies. He has been involved in registration trials of antineoplastic agents in a variety of solid tumors with significant activity in rare malignancies and sarcoma. 

His research group at the Laboratory of Experimental Oncology of KU Leuven concentrates on mesenchymal malignancies and developed more than 70 patient-derived xenograft models of soft tissue sarcomas and gastrointestinal stromal tumors since 2004. Furthermore the lab developed readily available tissue microarrays, blood collections and clinical databases related to various types of sarcoma. Schöffski's translational work forms the basis for multiple Master-, Doctoral and PhD thesis projects in his group.

Schöffski has published more than 380 papers. He has been an independent advisor to Cancéropôle Île-de-France, Paris (France), the Ontario Institute for Cancer Research, Toronto (Canada), the Comprehensive Cancer Center of Helsinki University Hospital (Finland) and the Belgian Nuclear Research Centre, Brussels/Mol (Belgium). He consults for a number of pharmaceutical companies, biotech companies, academic institutions and venture capital groups investing in oncology assets through his own consulting firm CADEAU BV in Belgium. His strong clinical and trial methodology background is the basis for various independent data monitoring activities for early and late stage clinical trials in oncology and related disciplines.

See also 
 EORTC

References

External links 

 University Hospitals Leuven http://www.uzleuven.be/en

German oncologists
KU Leuven alumni
Living people
1963 births